The Philippine Science High School Eastern Visayas Campus (PSHS-EVC) is one of the campuses of the Philippine Science High School System located at Pawing, Palo, Leyte.

History
The creation of the PSHS Eastern Visayas Campus was signed into law on 10 April 1992 through Republic Act 7373 known as An Act Establishing The Eastern Visayas Science High School.

By virtue of Republic Act 8057, the school was officially renamed as a campus of the PSHS System. The school officially started its operations on 4 July 1994.

In 1997, Republic Act 8496 known as An Act To Establish The Philippine Science High School System And Providing Funds Therefor unified all existing PSHS campuses into a single system of governance and management. The school is currently under the supervision of its campus director, Dr. Reynaldo Garnace.

As part of the PSHS System mission, the Eastern Visayas Campus provides scholarships to students with high aptitude in both science and mathematics, "helping the country reach a critical mass of professionals in science and technology".

Its students come from various parts of Eastern Visayas. The students hailing from the provinces of Biliran, Eastern Samar, Leyte, Northern Samar, Samar, and Southern Leyte ensure a highly diversified culture on-campus.

In 2016, Hillary Diane Andales, Grade 11 student from the PSHS-EVC, has been awarded the "Most Popular Vote" in the Breakthrough Junior Challenge with her video entry about Feynman’s Path Integrals. She won for her school a $100,000 worth of state-of-the-art DNA molecular-biology laboratory.

References

External links

PSHS Eastern Visayas Campus official website

Philippine Science High School System
High schools in Leyte (province)